Basic oxides are oxides that show basic properties in opposition to acidic oxides and that either
react with water to form a base; or
react with an acid to form a salt and water which are called neutralization reactions.

Etymology
"Basic oxides" is a compound of the words "Basic" and "oxides". The word oxides referred to the chemical compounds that one or more oxygen atoms combined with another element such as H2O or CO2. Based on their acid-base characteristics oxides can be classified into four categories: acidic oxides, basic oxides, and amphoteric oxides and neutral oxides.

Basic oxides, can also called base anhydrides which means "a base without water", are usually formed by reacting of oxygen with metals, especially alkali (+1 oxidation state) and alkaline earth metals (+2 oxidation state). Both of them are ionic oxide and can dissolve in water to form basic solutions of the metal hydroxide, whereas non-metals usually form acidic oxides. Basic oxide Li2O becomes base LiOH and BaO becomes Ba(OH)2 after react with water. In general, basicity of their oxides increases when the elements located downward at the left side of a periodic table (group 1 & 2), as the element become more metallic.

Alkali Metals (Group 1)
X2O + H2O → 2XOH   (X means group 1)

Alkaline Earth Metals (Group 2)
XO + H2O → X(OH)2   (X means group 2)

Examples include:
Sodium oxide, which reacts with water to produce sodium hydroxide
Magnesium oxide, which reacts with hydrochloric acid to form magnesium chloride
Copper(II) oxide, which reacts with nitric acid to form copper nitrate

Formation 
Examples of Oxides (Group 1 elements react with oxygen):

 Lithium reacts with oxygen to give oxide. Li2O

4 Li(s) + O2(g) → 2 Li2O(s)

 Sodium reacts with oxygen to give peroxide. Na2O2

2 Na(s) + O2(g) → Na2O2(s)

 Potassium reacts with oxygen to form superoxide. KO2

K(s) + O2(g) → KO2(s)

Examples
All oxides in Group 1 & 2 elements are basic (except BeO), they react with water to form a base:
 Lithium oxide reacts with water to produce Lithium hydroxide: Li2O(s) + H2O(l) → 2 Li+(aq) + 2 OH−(aq)
 Sodium oxide reacts with water to produce Sodium hydroxide: Na2O(s) + H2O(l) → 2 NaOH(aq)
 Potassium oxide reacts with water to produce Potassium hydroxide: K2O(s) + H2O(l) → 2 KOH(aq)
 Rubidium oxide reacts with water to produce Rubidium hydroxide: Rb2O(s) + H2O(l) → 2 RbOH(aq)                
 Cesium oxide reacts with water to produce Cesium hydroxide: Cs2O(s) + H2O(l) → 2 CsOH(aq) 
 Magnesium oxide reacts with water to produce Magnesium hydroxide: MgO(s) + H2O(l) → Mg(OH)2(aq)
 Calcium oxide reacts with water to produce Calcium hydroxide: CaO(s) + H2O(l) → Ca(OH)2(aq)
 Strontium oxide reacts with water to produce Strontium hydroxide: SrO(s) + H2O(l) → Sr(OH)2(aq)
 Barium oxide reacts with water to produce Barium hydroxide: BaO(aq) + H2O(l) → Ba(OH)2(aq)
 Radium oxide reacts with water to produce Radium hydroxide: RaO(aq) + H2O(l) → Ra(OH)2(aq)
Some oxide in Group 13 element is basic, it reacts with water to form a base:
 Thallium(I) oxide reacts with water to produce Thallium(I) hydroxide: Tl2O(s) + H2O(l) → 2 TlOH(aq) 
Some oxide in Group 15 element is basic, it reacts with water to form a base:
 Bismuth(III) Oxide reacts with water to produce Bismuth(III) hydroxide: Bi2O3(s) + 3H2O(l) → 2 Bi(OH)3(aq)
 In neutralization reactions, basic oxides reacts with an acid to form salt and water:
 Magnesium oxide reacts with hydrogen chloride (acid) to produce Magnesium chloride (salt) and water: MgO + 2 HCl → MgCl2 + H2O                                
 Sodium oxide reacts with hydrogen chloride (acid) to produce Sodium chloride (salt) and water: Na2O + 2HCl → 2NaCl + H2O
 Sodium hydroxide reacts with hydrogen chloride (acid) to produce Sodium chloride (salt) and water: NaOH + HCl → NaCl + H2O

See also

Acidic oxide
Amphoteric oxide

References 

Oxides